Fu Wenhua (born January 1965) is a major general in the People's Liberation Army of China.

He is an alternate member of the 20th Central Committee of the Chinese Communist Party.

Biography
Fu was born in January 1965, and graduated from the PLA Army Command Academy and PLA National Defence University, and once studied in Germany. 

Fu served in the 16th Group Army (now 78th Group Army) for a long time. He joined the Chinese Communist Party (CCP) in June 1985. In 2016, he was appointed chief of staff of the 54th Group Army (now 83rd Group Army), succeeding Xu Qiling. He became chief of staff of the 81st Group Army in March 2017. On 30 July 2017, he led his troops to participate in the military parade celebrating the 90th Anniversary of the Founding of the People's Liberation Army. In June 2022, he was admitted to member of the Standing Committee of the CCP Beijing Municipal Committee, the capital city's top authority.

He attained the rank of rear admiral (shaojiang) in July 2017.

References

1965 births
Living people
PLA National Defence University alumni
People's Liberation Army generals
Chinese politicians
Chinese Communist Party politicians
Alternate members of the 20th Central Committee of the Chinese Communist Party